Mathias Frank (born 9 December 1986) is a Swiss former road bicycle racer, who rode professionally between 2008 and 2021 for the , ,  and  teams. A strong climber, Frank finished 8th overall in the 2015 Tour de France, and won a breakaway stage in the 2016 Vuelta a España.

Professional career

2008–2013 
Mathias Frank started his professional cycling career with German outfit . He won his first ever professional win at the GP Triberg-Schwarzwald. However the German team folded after the season which meant Frank had to look elsewhere to continue his cycling career. He raced for the BMC Team for 5 years, and won 3 races with BMC, and great results at the Tour de Suisse.

IAM Cycling (2014–2016) 
He raced with the team for 3 years until it closed at the end of 2016. Frank finished 2nd overall at Tour de Suisse and 4th overall at Tour de Romandie in 2014. The following year 2015, Frank focused on racing the Tour de France general classification. He entered the breakaway on Stage 17 and finished 5th on that stage, advancing to 8th in the general classification. On Stage 19, Frank even advanced one place further in the general classification to 7th, however on Stage 20 to Alpe d'Huez, he dropped to 8th again, which he also ended up finishing in Paris. The following year 2016, Frank had bad luck in the Tour de France when he crashed out on Stage 14. This switched his focus to the Vuelta a Espana. He managed to get into several breakaways before finally winning a Stage on Stage 17.

AG2R La Mondiale (2017–2021) 
Frank signed an initial two-year contract with French squad , and moved his focus to supporting Romain Bardet in the Tour de France. Frank finished 7th overall in Tour de Suisse, as his preparation for the Tour de France. Frank helped Bardet reaching the podium in Paris. The following year Frank was left out of the Tour de France squad, however when Alexandre Geniez was lacking form, Frank was ready to step in and helped Bardet to 6th place in Paris.

Major results
Source: 

2006
 1st Stage 4 Tour des Aéroports
 2nd Road race, National Under–23 Road Championships
2007
 1st  Overall Thüringen Rundfahrt der U23
1st Stage 5
 1st Stage 4 Grand Prix Guillaume Tell
2008
 1st GP Triberg-Schwarzwald
 9th Overall Tour de l'Ain
2009
 1st Overall Grand Prix Guillaume Tell
 6th Overall Tour of Ireland
 8th Overall Tour de Wallonie
2010
 Tour de Suisse
1st  Mountains classification
1st  Sprints classification
2011
 6th Overall Tour de Suisse
2012
 1st  Swiss rider classification, Tour de Suisse
 10th Overall Giro del Trentino
1st Stage 1 (TTT)
 10th Overall Tour of Utah
2013
 Tour of Austria
1st Stages 4 & 5
 2nd Overall USA Pro Cycling Challenge
1st Stage 2
 3rd Grand Prix de Wallonie
 4th Overall Tour of California
 5th Overall Tour de Suisse
2014
 2nd Overall Critérium International
1st  Points classification
1st  Mountains classification
1st Stage 3
 2nd Overall Bayern Rundfahrt
1st Stage 2
 2nd Overall Tour de Suisse
1st  Swiss rider classification
 4th Overall Tour de Romandie
 7th Overall Circuit de la Sarthe
2015
 3rd Road race, National Road Championships
 5th Overall Arctic Race of Norway
 8th Overall Tour de France
2016
 1st Stage 17 Vuelta a España
 7th Overall Circuit de la Sarthe
 8th Overall Tour de Romandie
2017
 7th Overall Tour de Suisse
1st  Swiss rider classification
 7th Boucles de l'Aulne
2018
 4th Road race, National Road Championships
 5th Tre Valli Varesine
 9th Giro della Toscana
 10th Overall Tour of California
2019
 2nd Overall Tour de l'Ain
 3rd Road race, National Road Championships
 6th Gran Piemonte
2021
 5th Mercan'Tour Classic

General classification results timeline

References

External links

1986 births
Living people
People from Willisau District
Swiss male cyclists
Swiss Vuelta a España stage winners
Sportspeople from the canton of Lucerne